Farragus may refer to:

Gastromyzon farragus, fish species
Professor Farragus, a mad scientist from End of the World at Eight O'Clock by  Stanisław Lem
Faraj ben Salim, 13th century Sicilian-Jewish physician and translator
An occasional spelling for Ferragus, by Honoré de Balzac in old English translations

See also
Ferragus (disambiguation)
Farragut (disambiguation)